Olga Hostáková (born 11 April 1975) is a Czech former tennis player.

Hostáková won two singles and five doubles titles on the ITF Circuit in her career. On 18 July 1994, she reached her best singles ranking of world No. 336. On 4 December 1995, she peaked at No. 187 in the WTA doubles rankings.

Hostáková made her WTA Tour debut in the doubles draw at the 1995 Warsaw Cup.

ITF finals

Singles (2–0)

Doubles (5–1)

References
 
 

1975 births
Living people
Czech female tennis players